Rabindra Jha, born on 2 March 1978, is a Nepalese actor, comedian, and scriptwriter also known for his work in Nepali entertainment industry. He has been referred to in the media as "Munna"

Jha began his career with appearances in several television series in the late 1990s. He made his Kollywood debut in 2013 with 12 Nepali Ek Chihan. Early in his career, Jha was recognized for portraying serious and villainous roles in the television series like Mahakabi Vidyapati (1998), Pritam (1999) and Mamta (2001). He then starred in a series of drama, including Pach Patra (2007), Ek xal Ghadaaha (2008), Xutaha Ghail  (2008), Okara Agankak Bharah Masha (2009) and Oo Khali Muh Dekhai Xai (2009). Jha went on to act in Aaig Dhadaik Rahal Xai (2010), Kappar Coat (2010), Dom Kakxa (2010) and Push Jharh Ki Magh Jhar (2010). His highest-grossing films include the comedies like Jatra., Changa Chet (2018), Ram Kahani (2018), and Jatrai Jatra (2019). Many of his films display themes of Nepali national identity and connections with communities, or gender, racial, social and religious differences and grievances.

He is a frequent television presenter and stage show performer.

Early life and background 
Jha was born in Dhanusha District, Janakpur, Nepal, to Uma Kant Jha and Lila Devi Jha in a Maithili family.
His father was a government driver. From a young age, Jha was very interested in singing and acting. His father too enjoyed with his hobbies. He lived and grew up in Janakpur's Dhanusha District and later he moved to Kathmandu to complete his degree. He received his school education from Sankatmochan Dev Sharan Ramrati Higher School, simultaneously learning Drama.  He enrolled in Kathmandu's Nepal Commerce Campas for higher education. He requested his father that he wanted to learn drama further, and his father somehow managed to send him Delhi. Jha went to Delhi to learn drama and lived in Delhi for three years learning Drama. Jha also has an older brother and a sister. When Jha was a teenager, his father asked him what he aspired to be. Jha expressed his desire to become an actor.

After having obtained a degree in arts and commerce while in India, he studied drama in Delhi, India. During his classes, he had got an opportunity to cast a role in the movie Pinjar (film) but he left it due to his college rules. He completed his degree of drama from Adi Natya Dristhi.

After completing the degree, he returned to Nepal and completed his degree in arts. Jha effectively made himself driven with two degrees. He then joined Mithila Natyakala Parishad (MINAP).
He worked as a drama artist for 10 years with small movies. He also worked as a side actor in various films. One day, he was called for the movie Jatra. Disappointed with himself, he wanted to cast in the movie. Next day, Jha was signed for a lead role by director Pradeep Bhattarai for the movie Jatra . Although he debuted with the movie 12 Nepali Ek Chihan, he was unable to fix his position in the industries.

Career
Jha is the actor of the Nepali movie Jatra. He plays a role of Munna'.'

He has debuted with "12 Nepali Ek Chihan". He has been involved in movie Sunkesari, Kohalpur Express, Jatrai Jatra, Sherbahadur, Dui Rupaiya.

Rabindra Jha has also acted in a comedy Nepali horror movie Sunkesari in 2018. He was working in Radio Drama Sangor and Hilkor as script writer and later executed as director, which he left in 2017. He is currently working in Nepal Film Industry. He had also acted in other famous Maithali films like Pritam, Kanya Putra''.

Filmography

Awards and nominations

References

External links 

 
  on Instagram
  on Facebook

Living people
Nepalese male actors
1978 births
Nepalese male film actors
People from Dhanusha District
Nepalese male comedians